Anna Rydlówna (30 December 1884 – 6 March 1969) was a Polish nurse and recipient of the Florence Nightingale Medal.

The school of nursing in Krakow is named in her memory.

References

1884 births
1969 deaths
People from Kraków
Polish nurses
Florence Nightingale Medal recipients